EPL2T is a Ukrainian electric multiple unit for suburban commuter routes on lines electrified with 3 kV DC.
The design is based on the earlier ЕR2Т of the Latvian Rīgas Vagonbūves Rūpnīca in Riga, 35 units was manufactured by Luhanskteplovoz between 2000 and 2008.

Electric multiple units of Ukraine